Geopsammodius subpedalis, the underfoot tiny sand-loving scarab, is a species of aphodiine dung beetle in the family Scarabaeidae. It is found in North America.

References

Further reading

 
 
 

Scarabaeidae
Beetles described in 2006